Bobby Lynn Brantley (born April 6, 1948) is an American Republican politician from the State of Florida. He served as the 13th lieutenant governor of Florida, from 1987 to 1991.

Brantley began his political career in 1978 when he was elected to the Florida House of Representatives from a district based in Seminole and Lake Counties. He was reelected three times and represented parts of Central Florida in the House until in 1986.

In 1986, he won the Republican nomination for lieutenant governor, defeating Marilyn Evans-Jones, Betty Easley, and Tom Bush to become the running-mate for Tampa Mayor Bob Martinez, the Republican nominee for governor. In the general election, Martinez and Brantley defeated the Democratic ticket, consisting of State Rep. Steve Pajcic for governor and State Sen. Frank Mann for lieutenant governor, by 54.56 to 45.44%.

Brantley did not seek reelection in 1990, and retired from political office in 1991. As of 2011 he is a consultant and lobbyist at one of Florida's oldest law firms, Shutts & Bowen.

References

|-

|-

|-

Florida Republicans
Lieutenant Governors of Florida
Living people
1948 births
People from Atmore, Alabama